Henry Ware may refer to:

Henry Ware (Unitarian) (1764–1845), American preacher and theologian
Henry Ware Jr. (1794–1843), Unitarian theologian, son of the above
Henry Ware (bishop of Chichester) (died 1420), bishop of Chichester
Henry Ware (bishop of Barrow-in-Furness) (1830–1909), suffragan bishop from 1889 to 1909
Sir Henry Ware (lawyer) (1912–1989), British lawyer and government official

See also
Henry Ware Eliot (1843–1919), American industrialist